Nurlan Altynbekovich Koizhaiganov (Nūrlan Altynbekūly Qoijaiğanov; born March 27, 1977 in Ayagoz) is a retired amateur Kazakh Greco-Roman wrestler, who competed in the men's lightweight category. He scored top five finishes in the 60-kg division in two consecutive editions of the Asian Games (1998 and 2002), and later represented his nation Kazakhstan at the 2004 Summer Olympics. Before being retired from wrestling in 2005, Koizhaiganov also trained throughout his sporting career at Professional Sport Club Daulet in Semipalatinsk, under his personal coach Kanat Nurlasiev.

Koizhaiganov qualified for the Kazakh squad in the men's 60 kg class at the 2004 Summer Olympics in Athens. Earlier in the process, he placed first in his respective category from the Olympic Qualification Tournament in Tashkent, Uzbekistan to guarantee a spot on the Kazakh wrestling team. He easily ousted Italy's Paolo Fucile in his opening match by a quick 7–0 margin, and then overwhelmed 2000 Olympic bronze medalist Akaki Chachua of Georgia 7–6 in the prelim pool to clinch his spot for the next round of the competition. Koizhaiganov lost to neighboring Russia's Aleksey Shvetsov in the quarterfinal match at 1–3, and to Japan's Makoto Sasamoto in a consolation playoff with a comfortable 4–0 verdict, dropping him to sixth in the final standings.

References

External links
Profile – International Wrestling Database

1977 births
Living people
Kazakhstani male sport wrestlers
Olympic wrestlers of Kazakhstan
Wrestlers at the 2004 Summer Olympics
Wrestlers at the 1998 Asian Games
Wrestlers at the 2002 Asian Games
People from Ayagoz
Asian Games competitors for Kazakhstan